Wasco is a city in Sherman County, Oregon, United States. The population was 410 at the 2010 census.

Geography

Wascoite, a type of white clay-based mineral found near Biggs jasper, is locally named for Wasco.

Climate
This region experiences warm (but not hot) and dry summers, with no average monthly temperatures above 71.6 °F.  According to the Köppen Climate Classification system, Wasco has a warm-summer Mediterranean climate, abbreviated "Csb" on climate maps.

Demographics

2010 census
As of the census of 2010, there were 410 people, 182 households, and 111 families living in the city. The racial makeup of the city was 95.6% White, 0.5% African American, 0.7% Native American, 0.2% Asian, 0.2% Pacific Islander, 1.5% from other races, and 1.2% from two or more races. Hispanic or Latino people of any race were 2.0% of the population.

There were 182 households, of which 20.3% had children under the age of 18 living with them, 49.5% were married couples living together, 8.2% had a female householder with no husband present, 3.3% had a male householder with no wife present, and 39.0% were non-families. 31.3% of all households were made up of individuals, and 13.1% had someone living alone who was 65 years of age or older. The average household size was 2.25 and the average family size was 2.80.

The median age in the city was 50.2 years. 18% of residents were under the age of 18; 7.9% were between the ages of 18 and 24; 18.3% were from 25 to 44; 31.9% were from 45 to 64; and 23.9% were 65 years of age or older. The gender makeup of the city was 51.5% male and 48.5% female.

2000 census
As of the census of 2000, there were 381 people, 168 households, and 110 families living in the city. The population density was 394.5 people per square mile (151.7/km). There were 196 housing units at an average density of 202.9 per square mile (78.0/km). The racial makeup of the city was 94.23% White, 2.36% Native American, 0.26% Asian, 0.26% from other races, and 2.89% from two or more races. Hispanic or Latino people of any race were 3.41% of the population.

There were 168 households, out of which 25.0% had children under the age of 18 living with them, 56.5% were married couples living together, 4.8% had a female householder with no husband present, and 34.5% were non-families. 29.8% of all households were made up of individuals, and 16.1% had someone living alone who was 65 years of age or older. The average household size was 2.27 and the average family size was 2.73.

In the city, the population was spread out, with 23.1% under the age of 18, 4.2% from 18 to 24, 22.0% from 25 to 44, 28.3% from 45 to 64, and 22.3% who were 65 years of age or older. The median age was 45 years. For every 100 females, there were 101.6 males. For every 100 females age 18 and over, there were 103.5 males.

The median income for a household in the city was $35,917, and the median income for a family was $39,375. Males had a median income of $30,500 versus $21,875 for females. The per capita income for the city was $17,917. About 7.0% of families and 11.9% of the population were below the poverty line, including 16.9% of those under age 18 and 9.0% of those age 65 or over.

Transportation
Wasco State Airport

References

External links
Entry for Wasco in the Oregon Blue Book

Cities in Oregon
Cities in Sherman County, Oregon
1901 establishments in Oregon
Populated places established in 1901